Jan Solans Baldó (born 25 December 1997) is a Spanish rally driver. He won the 2019 Junior World Rally Championship, Spanish champion of Group N in 2016, champion of two-wheel drive and Group R2 in the Spanish Rally Championship Gravel in 2018 and winner of the Iberian Rally Trophy in 2016.

He is the younger brother of Nil Solans, who is also a rally driver.

Results

WRC results 

* Season still in progress.

WRC-2 results 

* Season still in progress.

WRC-3 results

JWRC results

Notes

References

External links  

 

1997 births
Living people
People from Vallès Occidental
Sportspeople from the Province of Barcelona
Spanish rally drivers
Catalan rally drivers
World Rally Championship drivers